The Real Adventures of Jonny Quest (also known as Jonny Quest: The Real Adventures) is an American animated television series produced by Hanna-Barbera and broadcast on Cartoon Network from August 26, 1996, to April 16, 1997. A continuation of the Jonny Quest (1964) series and The New Adventures of Jonny Quest (1986) series, it features teenage adventurers Jonny Quest, Hadji Singh, and Jessie Bannon as they accompany Dr. Benton Quest and bodyguard Race Bannon to investigate strange phenomena, legends, and mysteries in exotic locales. Action also takes place in the virtual realm of QuestWorld, a three-dimensional cyberspace domain rendered with computer animation. Conceived in the early 1990s, Real Adventures suffered a long and troubled development.

Hanna-Barbera dismissed creator Peter Lawrence in 1996 and hired new producers to finish the show. John Eng and Cosmo Anzilotti completed Lawrence's work; David Lipman, Davis Doi, and Larry Houston wrote new episodes with reworked character designs akin to those of classic Quest. Each team produced half of the show's fifty-two episodes. While Lawrence's team crafted stories of real-world mystery and exploration, later writers used science fiction and paranormal plots. Turner supported the show through a massive marketing campaign with thirty-three licensees. Real Adventures debuted with an unprecedented wide release on Cartoon Network, TBS, and TNT, airing twenty-one times per week. Critics have debated the merits of the show's animation, writing, and spirit compared to classic Quest, but it has also received praise in those categories.

Real Adventures failed to gain high ratings with its targeted demographics and its merchandise performed poorly, leading to cancellation after fifty-two episodes. Turner Home Entertainment and Warner Home Video have released eight VHS tapes, two laserdiscs, and twenty-six DVD episodes; reruns have appeared on Toonami, CNX, and other Turner networks. All 52 episodes were made available for digital purchase on the iTunes Store in 2013.

Development and history 
Hanna-Barbera created The Real Adventures of Jonny Quest in the early 1990s after being acquired by Turner Entertainment Co. Turner planned a series of year-long "Turner-wide initiatives" to capitalize on old characters and create new franchises. Turner received copious fan mail and phone inquiries about Quest, and observed "incredibly high" marketing Q Scores. The show was also Hanna-Barbera's most popular venture in the action-adventure genre; no other contemporary series featured realistic children enjoying lifelike adventures. With William Hanna and Joseph Barbera's blessings, the company planned a new series, live action film, and two telefilms—Jonny's Golden Quest and Jonny Quest vs. The Cyber Insects. Combined with a substantial marketing campaign, the project would be their largest initiative since Turner acquired H-B. Turner Home Entertainment President Philip Kent claimed Quest would be a "consumer-products bonanza", and the company considered Real Adventures the linchpin of the Quest revival. Real Adventures, the live-action film, and release of classic episodes on VHS would constitute a "Year of Jonny Quest" marketing blitz. Delayed until 1996, the project echoed 1994's "Year of the Flintstones" and 1995's "Year of Yogi Bear". Production on Real Adventures commenced in 1993. Turner hired a team led by director Dick Sebast, writer Peter Lawrence, and art director Takashi Masunaga. The firm appointed Stephanie Sperber head of the Quest task force in 1994.

Hanna-Barbera President Fred Seibert allowed Lawrence to create a new team of companions for Jonny, but Lawrence chose to revive the original group. Sebast and Lawrence decided to make the series as realistic as possible through accurate physics and depictions of machinery. Lawrence emphasized believability, eschewing "ridiculous ...laser guns" for real sidearms. The creative team researched child psychology, ensuring they could depict realistic action and consequences without fueling nightmares. Seibert touted Quest as the "Home Alone of adventure", with "high-tech, multicultural themes" that would appeal to contemporary youth. Promoters promised the new Quest would avoid "mindless violence, chauvinism, xenophobia and insensitivity", addressing historical criticisms of the classic series. Turner also claimed that Quest would appeal to any gender, stating, "Traditionally, action adventure animation may be stronger with boys, but in this case, storylines are being developed to draw girls in ... we're really hoping for a wide berth of viewership." Seibert further described the show's theme as "The X-Files for kids", citing difficult questions and mysteries to be posed in each episode. Departures from the classic series included new character designs and the introduction of a new character to the Quest family. Takashi designed Jonny to be "edgy and handsome", and rendered characters in the style of Japanese animation to differentiate from American superhero cartoons. The team used a new character—Race's daughter, Jessie Bannon—to create conflict with Jonny. She was introduced in Jonny's Golden Quest as Race's daughter by Jezebel Jade. Lawrence initially titled the show Jonny Quest's Extraordinary Adventures, but the title changed in 1995 to its final name.

Intended for a 1995 release with 65 episodes, Real Adventures fell into development hell; roughly 30 scripts and only eight reels were in progress by March 1995. Both Lawrence and Takashi were removed in 1996, hiring John Eng and Cosmo Anzilotti to finish the first twenty-six episodes. Certain sequences necessitated exhaustive work and heavy revision. A new team led by David Lipman, Davis Doi and Larry Houston finished twenty-six more for broadcast as a separate series named The New Jonny Quest. Time Warner's acquisition of Turner negated this plan, leading to the episodes' release as the second season of Real Adventures.

Animation 
Peter Lawrence aimed to "go beyond cartooning and into animated film-making" for the show's storytelling. Producers contracted seven studios to animate the first season, including Pacific Animation Co. in Japan and Toon's Factory in France. Japanese and Korean animators drew traditional cel sequences and added color; an international team handled digital post-production and QuestWorld scenes. Teva, a subsidiary of Total Group, organized a post-production team in Paris, led by Eric Jacquot, Gilles Deyries, and Pascal Legeay. Using video post-production high-end specialized tools, including Henry, Spirit, Flame, and others, the team strove to deliver a high-speed computer editing and post-production process. The majority of the first season's footage was digitally inked and painted to enhance background elements. Producers applied the process in excess of twenty hours per episode, adding light effects, rain, snow, glitter, reflections, and fog.

Hanna-Barbera implemented a new computer system to combine manual animation with digital paint, and to provide camera movement flexibility, which created a partial three-dimensional effect. Takashi felt the system made the creative team "honest filmmakers" through hands-on production. Lawrence described the system in 1995:

 The "pencil test [is] imported into the computer" referred to by Lawrence was an animatic. This process was implemented by Stephen Toback's H-B Production Technology Group, which also set up and maintained the in-house digital ink and paint systems for Hanna Barbera, as well as the post-production Avid and Pro Tools systems. Japan-based Mook Studios exclusively animated the second season without digital post-processing. Real Adventures maintained the classic show's realistic violence, featuring off-screen deaths of villains and allies.

Music 
Bodie Chandler directed music for Quest, and Gary Lionelli, Thomas Chase, Stephen Rucker, Lawrence H. Brown, Guy Moon, Kevin Kiner, Christophe Beck, and Mark Koval wrote incidental music and cues. Lionelli conceived a new main theme based on the original 1960s Jonny Quest theme by Hoyt Curtin. Composer Guy Moon considered working for the show the "hardest thing I've done in my life" due to the producers' demands for epic music: "They want a big orchestra with a good synth rig... It's great because they push me so much I'll probably replace my whole demo reel with 'Jonny Quest' music... It's hip and it's current." Stephen Rucker and Thomas Chase (who later composed in The Powerpuff Girls) used MIDI to facilitate composing. Chase appreciated the producers' commitment to scoring, noting, "For many kids, animation music is their first exposure to orchestral music."

QuestWorld 
Producers cultivated an element of virtual reality through QuestWorld, a cyberspace simulation rendered with three-dimensional computer animation and motion capture. QuestWorld was designed as a futuristic application of contemporary technology, similar to the classic series' high-tech lasers, satellites, and robots. Seibert traced its origin to "the same problem that James Bond has... When you look at even his newest gadgets, they're somewhat quaint." H-B marketers polled children on their familiarity with virtual reality, discovering that each child was aware of the concept. Planners took inspiration from cyberpunk novels written by Neal Stephenson and William Gibson, including Snow Crash. Short, independent QuestWorld segments called "Quest Bytes" concluded certain episodes.

H-B initially contracted Dream Quest Images to animate QuestWorld, but was credited for work on only a single episode as competitor Disney acquired the studio in April 1996, necessitating a different vendor. Animation company Buzz F/X, based in Montreal and Santa Monica, created first season sequences. Work began in April 1996 with the opening titles—a gliding journey through a canyon of green, cartographic lines with scenes illuminated upon the walls. QuestWorld characters were created as wire frame models, augmented with faces scanned from clay busts, then digitally painted and inked. Buzz F/X used mostly inexperienced animators, as budgetary constraints would not permit hiring seasoned employees.

Work followed on "Escape to Questworld" and "Trouble on the Colorado" as animators worked 12 hours a day, six days a week in a small garage with inadequate computers. Buzz F/X augmented the small team in July with ten recruits, but only two were experienced. Amateur employees struggled with lighting, and with synchronizing jerky motion capture from the House of Moves in Venice Beach; Quest was their first capture production order. By August, the team was working 14 hours a day, seven days a week, including full nights and mornings.

After two more episodes, Buzz F/X terminated its unprofitable contract with H-B, later filing for bankruptcy in 1997 due to $3.6 million of debt created by work on Quest. H-B hired Blur Studio to finish the second season's scenes on a ten-week production schedule. Blur used Intergraph hardware, and its sharp performance attracted press attention and sealed an amicable relationship with H-B. Both companies produced in total roughly one hundred minutes of computer animation for QuestWorld.

International promotion and network run 
Turner Entertainment promoted the series in forty countries and fourteen languages to establish international markets. Broadcasters included Antena 3 in Spain, TF1 in France, Channel One in Russia, RAI in Italy, Taurus Film in Germany, the BBC in the United Kingdom and Asia Television in ten Asian countries, representing ATL's first animated series to be broadcast in both English and Cantonese. Turner planned to introduce US-style animation to the Asian market through Quest. The show was launched in Singapore on TCS Channel 5 (now known as MediaCorp Channel 5) to take advantage of Singapore's "sophisticated retail sector and well-developed licensing industry". Brandweek reported in 1995 that the show's budget, including merchandising and promotional costs, topped $40 million.

Director Richard Donner, producer Lauren Shuler Donner, and Jane Rosenthal purchased rights for a live-action film, having expressed interest in the property after Turner acquired H-B. Peter Segal was attached to direct. Slated to begin production in mid-1995, filming was delayed until 1996 and ultimately never began. Turner advertised Real Adventures as the "next evolution in children's programming ... [redefining] television animation for the next generation." The company hosted a 1995 discussion with Peter Lawrence and Takashi at Yanceyville, and later aired previews at United States waterpark events. Staged in major US cities, these "dive-in theaters" featured previews of new series and local celebrities, including Jennifer Love Hewitt, Lacey Chabert, Cameron Finley, and Ashley Johnson for the UCLA event. Turner announced the debut countries and TV stations on May 1, 1996.

Turner aired Real Adventures seven nights a week on TBS, TNT, and Cartoon Network for an unprecedented 21 weekly showings. Turner aired several commercial spots featuring the Quest logo and show introductions to build viral support. Turner's marketers surmised that juvenile groups watching TNT in the morning, TBS in the afternoon, or Cartoon Network in prime time and late night were mutually exclusive. Real Adventures premiered August 26, 1996, three months after a twenty-hour "Farewell Marathon" of original Quest.

The show averaged a 2.0 Nielsen rating over August and September 1996, considered a strong start for an animated series. Though Cartoon Network suffered declining viewership in 1996, Quest was consistently one of the highest-rated programs; later season-one episodes drew around 650,000 viewers. Real Adventuress merchandise performed poorly, and it failed to build consistent ratings in its targeted demographics (though it did attract adult audiences). Turner tried to revive interest in February 1997 with a contest for an adventurous trip to Jamaica called Quest World Adventure. Cartoon Network did not order new episodes beyond the 52nd. Reruns aired for two years on Toonami until September 24, 1999, on Cartoon Network in other formats until 2004; and on CNX until 2003.

Overview 
The show's premise is that Dr. Quest, a famous phenomenologist, investigates mysterious occurrences and exotic locales with his son, Jonny Quest, adopted son Hadji Singh, bodyguard Race Bannon, Race's daughter Jessie, and pet bulldog Bandit. Real Adventures is set a few years after the classic series, making Jonny and his friends teenagers. Lawrence aimed to use "existing, real phenomenon"—such as the "Airstrips of Nazca, the Ruins of Teotihuacan or the possible existence of Giant Squid"—to capture audiences' curiosity. Stressing plausibility, he suggested writers cover real-world enigmas, cryptozoology, unique locales, an alien posing as the vice president, and fictional but "believable" mysteries. The Quests would frequently visit the virtual environment of QuestWorld, and encounter the villainous Jeremiah Surd and Ezekiel Rage. Paralyzed years prior by Race's SWAT team, Surd would try to exact revenge through technology; Rage—a former government agent left for dead on a botched mission—would try to destroy the world with nuclear terrorism.

The Quests would sparingly fight "monsters of the week", instead battling antagonists whose conflicts lay in "personal objective or ambition ... opposed by Dr. Quest". Lawrence stationed the family at a new compound on the coast of Maine, replete with houses, barns, and workshops. Rooms suited for each character included a library for Dr. Quest, workshop for Jonny, computer-equipped den for Jessie, dojo and gym for Race, and lighthouse lookout for Hadji's meditation. Lawrence equipped Dr. Quest with a fleet of air, land, and sea vehicles, including a 1940s biplane and state-of-the-art catamaran named Questor with diving bells and smaller research vessels stored in the hulls. Peter Lawrence prided Real Adventures on the strength of its writing, opining that "very few writers in this or any other field actually write visually," and contesting that each episode would have "enough material or potential to develop into a movie".

Characters 

Peter Lawrence described Jonny as a "hero in training" on the cusp of adulthood. He remarked that Jonny possessed "a straight-ahead, right-on attitude" free of introspection or self-doubt. At age 14, Jonny was a confident problem-solver prone to getting in trouble. Writers framed him as more an intuitive thinker than an intellectual, and created tension by contrasting his father's academic leanings with Jonny's affinity for Race's daring lifestyle. Jonny inherited his father's driving curiosity (rendering him a "walking query"), as well as his mother's "restless, adventurous spirit". Takashi designed Jonny to be lean, wiry, athletic, and coordinated. Creative directors centered episodes around Jonny; Seibert summarized the shift:

Hadji, age 16, became Dr. Quest's personal assistant, lacking his mentor's formal education but sharing his burning interest in archaeology, anthropology and the paranormal. A Hindu and yogi, he held a fatalistic attitude towards the show's drama, reacting to situations "from the philosophical point of view that everything is as it's supposed to be". Hadji often used wise aphorisms, taken from diverse cultures and sources and sometimes baffling Jonny. Lawrence cut Hadji's classic telekinesis to align his abilities with realistic yogi practices. "He doesn't say things like 'Sim, Sim Sala Bim' anymore," season one voice actor Michael Benyaer explained. "The writers and producers actually researched the actual yogic powers. He can do more plausible stuff. There is an episode where Hadji pretends to stop his breathing so that the bad guys think he is dead." Takashi drew Hadji taller and thinner than his classic counterpart.

Jessie Bannon, age 15, was characterized to be just as tough, smarter, and more thoughtful than Jonny. Written as "more of an egghead", she elected to spend time with Dr. Quest as Jonny did with Race, and was "more in tune with Hadji". Turner conceived Jessie as cool, independent, and a strong role model for contemporary girls. Peter Lawrence took pains to ensure Jessie would not be written as "a guy in a skirt", and made her more mature than Jonny. Race Bannon (Jessie's father) age 38, retained his classic, laconic sense of humor and fearless, dependable nature. He retired from government work over ethical scruples with his former intelligence agency. Writers noted that Race was helplessly overprotective of Jessie, and Jonny was "the boy Race never had". Race was also given a western-US accent and a knack for crafting elaborate, colorful similes. Peter Lawrence sculpted Race to be a "cowboy philosopher or philosopher-warrior". Writers tasked Race with physical and self-defense training for the Quest team.

Dr. Benton Quest, age 55, retired from government research and operated from the "Quest Compound" on the coast of Maine. Driven by curiosity, he was "consulted by individuals, governments and corporations" to investigate enigmatic events. Described as "single-minded—almost to the point of obsession—in his pursuit of knowledge", he often encountered trouble as "his drive to learn blanks out more basic instincts like self-preservation." Jessie appreciated his ponderous sense of humor. The show's promoters summarized him as the "benevolent king" archetype. Bandit the family dog also appeared in the series. Lawrence removed Bandit's clownish origins, stressing that Bandit could not understand English, nor reliably save the family from perilous situations.

Summarizing the group's behavior, Lawrence wrote, "Jonny's response to danger will be close to Race's. Jessie's intrigue with mysterious, unexplained phenomena will be close to Dr. Quest's and Hadji, with his roots in a different culture and a more spiritual approach to life, is different again." Takashi designed each character as physically fit and well-sculpted to reflect "a more exercise-oriented society". Fred Seibert downplayed worries that the new characters would disappoint cult fans of the classic series. He hoped Real Adventures would find success as new interpretations of comic book heroes had done.

Second season changes 
Season two directors Larry Houston and Davis Doi changed the show to resemble the classic franchise. Writer Glenn Leopold revived Hadji's latent psionic powers—including spoon-bending and rope tricks—as he felt the first season's realism was "not that interesting to watch". All characters lost a year in age; Jonny became 13. Writer Lance Falk returned Race to governmental guard duty, sealed by an episodic visit with classic Quest spymaster Phil Corven. Race lost his western accent (with Falk even comparing Race's western accent to Batman having a French accent), and Dr. Quest regained his classic red hair and exhibited rudimentary combat skills. Falk regarded Jessie as the "missing piece needed to complete the Quest family", and Leopold added slight romantic overtones to episodes. Some fans complained about changes to Jessie, criticized as a damsel in distress with stereotypically female pink clothes. Jonny saved Jessie from danger several times. Falk defended his portrayal as giving her realistic, human fears, such as claustrophobia. Censors asked the second season team to replace firearms with dart guns, notably in the episode "General Winter".

Second season writers took greater creative liberties with Real Adventures, invoking ghosts, other dimensions, and megalomaniacal schemes. Leopold and Falk sought to create a "slam-bang adventure show with real monsters" and heightened narrative emphasis on Jonny and his friends. Falk explained that cool contrivances took precedence over accuracy, stating that "Jonny Quest is a show with one foot in the fantastic, and one foot solidly based in reality." Opposed to QuestWorld, the new team was nonetheless contractually obligated to use it in their episodes. Falk felt that virtual reality undermined the show's "strong connection to reality", and suggested that after so many dangerous incidents Dr. Quest would have turned the system off.

Writers brought back several classic characters, including Pasha the Peddler, Jezebel Jade, Dr. Zin and his twin daughters, Anaya and Melana,. Falk honored Quest creator Doug Wildey by creating an eponymous grandfather for Jonny in the episode "Nuclear Netherworld", as well as homage to William Hanna's birthstate of New Mexico where Jonny's grandfather resides. The team created Estella Velasquez as Jessie's mother to retcon the telefilms, feeling that Jade would never get married. Writers eventually killed off villains Ezekiel Rage and Dr. Jeremiah Surd in favor of new adversaries. Comparing Quest without Zin to "James Bond without S.P.E.C.T.R.E.", Falk penned a season finale featuring classic robot spies and a visceral fight between Dr. Quest and Zin. Falk planned to resuscitate Palm Key as the Quest home in new episodes. Cartoon Network did not renew Real Adventures, despite a pledge to explore the history of Jonny's mother Rachel in the season premiere.

Episodes

Cast 
The first season of Real Adventures featured J. D. Roth as Jonny, George Segal as Dr. Quest, Robert Patrick as Race, Jesse Douglas as Jessie, Michael Benyaer as Hadji, and veteran voice actors Frank Welker and Michael Bell as Dr. Jeremiah Surd and Ezekiel Rage, respectively. A childhood fan of the original series, J.D. Roth was inspired by Turner's vision for the new series and swiftly accepted the role of Jonny. Roth was attracted by Jonny's "star quality", and approved of his characterization as a real kid without superpowers. He enjoyed Jonny's infectious enthusiasm and impulsive alacrity. Roth also admired the show's educational quality, something he had tried to integrate in his personal television pilots. When asked about how he played the relationship with Jonny's father, he commented, "Jonny is crazy about his dad. He looks up to him and thinks he is the smartest man ever to walk to face of the earth. He has the typical teenage relationship with his father, but his father definitely sees something in him. Dr. Quest knows that Jonny is going to be something really special." Michael Benyaer also enjoyed playing Hadji: "[he] is one of the few roles for an ethnic actor that is not a bad guy. I mean, how many East Indian heroes have been on television? Hadji is for the sensitive kids out there. He is the outsider in all of us." A Star Wars fan, Benyaer was happy to work with Mark Hamill for "In the Realm of the Condor". Peter Lawrence's request for an Indian-descended voice actor was seen as an "unusual case of multi-ethnic casting".

The producers struggled to cast Jessie Bannon. Peter Lawrence ultimately chose Jesse Douglas, who he felt reflected Jessie's energy and intelligence—"[Jesse Douglas] has immense energy, huge energy, and is the kind of woman who could do all the kind of things Jessie could do—you know, athletic, smart, so and so forth [sic]." Douglas impressed Lawrence with her active lifestyle, including ballet, equestrianism, and tennis. When asked about the character's inclusion, Douglas stated, "I'd be bummed if I upset anybody. Jessie is pretty cool. It is not like she is a girl who is whining all the time. If anything, she is a really good springboard for the rest of the storyline." Roth supported her, claiming that "Jonny hasn't discovered girls yet but when he does Jessie would be the type of girl he'd like to be with...I think something will happen between them but right now Jess is his best friend." H-B Chief Fred Seibert agreed, hinting that as adults "there might be a Tracy/Hepburn thing going on." Turner approached George Segal to audition for the part of Dr. Quest. Segal described the show as having "a real family feeling about it... I'd never seen this stuff before. That was quite remarkable."

Hanna-Barbera bought out the first cast's contracts and hired new actors for the second season. This cast featured Quinton Flynn as Jonny, John de Lancie as Dr. Quest, Granville Van Dusen (for the first two episodes) and Robert Foxworth as Race, Jennifer Hale as Jessie, and Rob Paulsen as Hadji. Paulsen previously voiced Hadji in The New Adventures of Jonny Quest and the two Quest telefilms. Don Messick was hired to reprise his classic role as Dr. Quest, but was forced into retirement by a stroke during early sessions. Van Dusen voiced Bannon in the 1986 Quest series, and Foxworth took over the part after auditioning for Dr. Quest. Frank Welker, Michael Bell and B.J. Ward reprised their respective roles as Surd, Rage and Iris (the QuestWorld A.I.) in the second season.

Throughout the two seasons, several notable guest stars included Kevin Conroy, Earl Boen, Clancy Brown, Robert Ito, James Shigeta, Irene Bedard, Lucy Liu, Brock Peters, Tristan Rogers, Edward Asner, Julian Sands, Helene Udy, Mayim Bialik, Mark Hamill, Andreas Katsulas, Jeffrey Tambor, Dorian Harewood, Clive Revill, Kenneth Mars, Nick Chinlund, George Kennedy, Clyde Kusatsu, Dean Jones, Thomas Gibson, Sarah Douglas, Tasia Valenza and Carl Lumbly. Season two writer Lance Falk has also regretted not thinking about veteran voice actor John Stephenson, who was the very first voice of Dr. Quest, for a guest role.

Marketing 
Turner launched a massive marketing campaign to promote Real Adventures, intending to reach 80% of American children aged six to eleven. Each Turner network spent $5 to $7 million for a total $20 million invested in promotion; the company contracted 33 licensees. Other reports pegged the budget at $40 million, and Marketing Week estimated that the series launched with $300 million of merchandising support. The Wall Street Journal called Quest a "property to watch" in 1995; People and Good Housekeeping considered it a surefire blockbuster. Turner provided digital and bound style guides featuring collections of Quest artwork, coloring instructions, and product ideas. Produced for $100,000 and believed to be the first of its kind, the digital style guide included fonts, logos, character art, merchandising mock-ups, voice clips, and other interactive content. Hanna-Barbera launched Questworld.com as the show's internet hub, presenting it as if written by members of the Quest team. Complementing the show's educational, real-world premise, the site hosted links to academic, archaeological, and exploratory websites. Turner announced 32 licensees as of summer 1996.

Turner marketed Real Adventures through a substantial diversity of products, considering its Quest campaign a role model for future shows. Galoob acquired figurine licensing rights in 1995 and created a product line of vehicles, figures, and Micro Machines for fall 1996 release. Turner felt that Galoob's commitment legitimized the Quest marketing plan, and next secured partnership with Pizza Hut and food retailers. Pillsbury included $3 mail-in rebates for future Quest videos, display contests, and instant coupon offers on over 20 million packages. Campbell Soup Company released six holographic miniature posters on the same number of SpaghettiOs cans; the posters were awarded in Converting in 1997. General Mills outfitted boxes of Honey Nut Cheerios and Cinnamon Toast Crunch with offers for T-shirts and other items. Over five thousand Pizza Hut restaurants held a two-month-long give-away of figurines with meals during the show's launch. Galoob failed to build popularity for its toys outside the United States, and discontinued the line in 1997.

Upper Deck Company used art, sketches, and plots from the first season to create a sixty-piece card collection. Turner also marketed Zebco fishing poles bearing the Quest logo. Kid Rhino produced a cassette audio adventure based on the episode "Return of the Anasazi". The show's credits advertised a soundtrack available from Rhino, never sold or otherwise promoted. Turner listed several products in a "Quest Adventure Value Pack" coupon catalogue.

Marketers tied in classic Quest merchandise, launching a classic H-B promotion with Days Inn hotels, Planet Hollywood restaurants, and Little Debbie snack cakes and offering rebates for Cyber Insects and classic episodes. The marketing campaign culminated with the release of eight VHS Real Adventures season one episodes. Turner also released two episodes on laserdisc. Metropolitan newspapers worked with Turner to promote the videos through grab-bag give-aways. Turner sold merchandise through several international distributors, and expected to make a $60 million profit per year in the Asia-Pacific region alone.

Savoy Brands International handled South American distribution, involving 750,000 retail outlets in Argentina, Chile, Peru, Guatemala, Honduras, Panama, Venezuela, Ecuador and Columbia. Turner debuted Quest at a cocktail party for the European Licensing Fair in late 1996, and released merchandise in Europe through 90,000 retail outlets over the next six months. Copyright Promotions Licensing Group handled lincensing in the United Kingdom. Turner ensured that the license agreements forbade retailers from discounting Quest items. The size of the marketing initiative left one newspaper reviewer wondering, "are [the Quests] back because they're too cool to die, or because they're too well known to be squandered as a licensing product?" Turner worried that the promotion might overhype the brand, and timed commercial rollouts over the life of the show. H-B chief Fred Seibert expected high sales and success:

 Dark Horse Comics composed a 12-issue series released over the show's first run, expecting higher store patronage and cross-selling. Editor Phil Amara assured fans that the comics would contain tributes to the classic Jonny Quest. Kate Worley wrote the Real Adventures series and Francisco Lopez illustrated; guest writers and artists regularly contributed. A lifetime fan of Quest, Eisner Award-winner Paul Chadwick drew the cover of the final issue, depicting Jonny's descent into a cave on Easter Island. Dark Horse worked with Galoob to ship comic shop-locator phone numbers and preview-URLs with figurines. The company also advertised and released a special three-issue series through mail offers with over 8 million boxes of Honey Nut Cheerios. Three two-page "mini-adventures" packaged with existing Dark Horse products preceded the series' release. Dark Horse also worked with Converse to stage a promotion in early 1997 for a fan to appear in a Quest comic.

Terry Bisson and others working under the alias "Brad Quentin" produced 11 original novellas featuring adventure and virtual reality themes. Critics appreciated that the books may have drawn kids to reading, especially those interested in technology. Only certain comics and coloring books used season two's designs, such as Dark Horse's Countdown to Chaos, featuring General Vostok. Turner did not market the show again until April 2004, when Warner Home Video released the episodes "Escape to Questworld" and "Trouble on the Colorado" as TV Premiere DVD: The Real Adventures of Jonny Quest on MiniDVD.

Cover-up at Roswell 

Virgin Sound and Vision produced an adventure game for the series named Cover-Up At Roswell, released in August 1996. Known as Escape from Quest World in development, Roswell cost $1 million to make. Virgin handled all marketing, sales, and distribution; Turner cross-promoted. Developers recycled fifty minutes of footage and art from six season one episodes to construct a new story about the Quest family gathering alien artifacts and saving an extraterrestrial from autopsy at The Pentagon. Jeremiah Surd and the Men in Black of General Tyler plan to misuse the technology and try to hinder the Quests. Gameplay consists of clicking areas on images of locations to navigate paths. Players sometimes encounter minigames, such as guiding a diving bell away from rocks or shooting rats with a slingshot. Virgin designed certain segments to be viewed with packaged stereostopic Chromatek plastic glasses.

Virgin estimated the game would provide 20–25 hours of game play for adults and 80–100 hours for children. The season two cast provided all voices except for Michael Benyaer as Hadji and Charles Howerton as Dr. Quest. The game's music featured a "high-intensity orchestral sound" prone to monotony. One reviewer praised Roswell for "good entertainment and variety", but regretted low replay value and no modes of difficulty. Critics were divided over the puzzles, naming them both "ingenious" and "elementary". Peter Scisco of ComputerLife and FamilyPC's testers criticized some of the puzzles for relying on "reflexes, not logical thinking".

Entertainment Weekly rated the game B+, naming the puzzles "unimaginative...Pac-Man rip-offs and dopey jigsaws". Scisco appreciated the nonviolent content and the inclusion of Jessie as a strong female character, but considered the extraterrestrial story too familiar. A writer from the Sydney Morning Herald warned against buying the game for easily frightened children, but recommended it for those who enjoy mental challenges.

Other promotions 
Turner, TBS, and Holiday Inn partnered to hold an essay contest as part of the Safe America Foundation's "Quest for Safety" drive. From October 9 to November 4, 1996, spots encouraged children to write essays about important safety issues and personal safety. A panel of public safety and community leaders selected the winner, dubbing them the "Safest Kid in America". TBS posted the winner's essay to the kids section of its website and awarded them a position on the Real Adventures float for the 1997 Tournament of Roses Parade in Pasadena. Second-prize winners received bicycle helmets, T-shirts, and Jonny Quest lapel pins. Turner staged an international contest in February 1997 called "Quest World Adventure", featuring the grand prize of a trip to a "secret island" (Jamaica) in July to take part in a staged dramatic scenario.

Commercials instructed fans to mail in episodes' geographical destinations during sweeps week. Advertisements appeared through Time Warner's television channels, Sports Illustrated for Kids, DC Comics publications, radio stations, and Warner Brothers stores. The contest marked the first time that Cartoon Network U.S., TNT Europe, Cartoon Network Europe, Cartoon Network Asia, and Cartoon Network Latin America united for a single promotion. Turner encouraged local cable operators to submit their own spots, generating 34,000 ads among 174 cable systems for a total of $3.4 million cross-channel media support. 50,000 children with a median age of ten entered the competition, and 20,000 answered correctly. Turner selected ten viewers from the United States and nine from Latin America and Asia as grand-prize winners. They and two-hundred others received Quest-themed adventure packs, including a backpack, flashlight and siren, travel journal, pen, T-shirt, and glow sticks. Cartoon Network aired the names of winning children on a special feature in which Jeremiah Surd issued personal threats.

Winners received all-expenses-paid trips to Ocho Rios, Jamaica, with up to three family members. Planners kept the destination secret until shortly before travel. In Jamaica, kids combated Surd's "environmental terrorism" by preventing him from finding the Jamaican "Irie" stones. Children received clues on the mission through e-mails seemingly written by Jonny Quest. Posing as allies, network employees prepared clues, buried treasure, and hosted barbecues, reggae concerts, and rafting trips. Participants searched for the stones at the White River, Dunn's River Falls, and Prospect Plantation; hosts filmed the proceedings for possible future promotions. The quest centered on cerebral challenges and puzzles. Attendees also learned about the history and ecology of Jamaica. The adventure doubled the show's ratings for February sweeps and tripled Questworld.coms hits. Brandweek awarded it the year's top honors for a global marketing promotion.

Home media 
On October 8, 1996, Turner Home Entertainment and the Cartoon Network Video line released all four volumes of the series on VHS, "The Alchemist", "Rage's Burning Wheel", "The Darkest Fathoms" and "Escape to Questworld", with each videocassette containing two episodes along with two bonus shorts from the What a Cartoon! series. Warner Home Video released only "Escape to Questworld" on MiniDVD in April 2004, then WHV (via Hanna-Barbera Cartoons and Warner Bros. Family Entertainment) released the first thirteen episodes on February 17, 2009 as Season 1, Volume 1 of The Real Adventures of Jonny Quest on DVD in Region 1. On March 27, 2012, Warner Archive released The Real Adventures of Jonny Quest: Season 1, Volume 2 on DVD in Region 1 as part of their Hanna–Barbera Classics Collection. This is a Manufacture-on-Demand (MOD) release, available exclusively through Warner's online store and Amazon.com. The complete second (and final) season was released to DVD on November 10, 2015 from Warner Archive. All 52 episodes were made available for digital purchase in 2013 on the iTunes Store. This represents the most recent show to be released under the Hanna-Barbera banner on DVD all subsequent shows would use the Cartoon Network banner.

Critical reception 
Announcement of Jessie Bannon's inclusion caused backlash among Quest fans. TV Guide'''s editors feared that Jonny and Jessie would become romantically entangled, declaring her an "icky female". H-B Chief Fred Seibert responded, "Jessie is a little older and smarter than Jonny... We're not doing Moonlighting here." Seibert also denied that Jessie had been created solely to appeal to little girls, citing extant support for Jonny and the classic team. A Miami Herald columnist called Jessie an "effort to rewrite the past to conform to the sociopolitical mandates of the present" and political correctness "run amok". Billboard conversely welcomed the change over an all-male cast. The fiasco subsided after the Cyber Insects telefilm aired; the Atlanta Journal-Constitution rebuffed the "icky girl" label, as Jessie saved Jonny's life and taught him patience. A test screening of Cyber Insects to  males revealed that though some questioned her addition, most understood that like certain elements criticized in the original series, it was a reflection of the times.

Some fans still took issue with the series' distance from classic Quest, which suffered accusations of cultural insensitivity and "racial and sexual stereotypes". Real Adventures evoked critical comparisons to the original series. Cinefantastique felt Real Adventures remained true to the classic show's formula, and praised the "impressive" cast. Another critic recommended the show to "die-hard adult fans", affirming that Real Adventures maintained the violence and off-screen deaths of the old series, as even the opening titles featured "explosions, murder and mayhem". The Washington Post judged the first season as "grittier and more lifelike" than the original Quest. Chicago Tribune critic Allan Johnson agreed that Real Adventures was less "way-out" and contrasted the shows in detail. TV Guide applauded the writing as "miles deeper and darker than on the old show"; Hadji's quotations impressed the magazine's reviewer. Chicago's Daily Herald called the first episode "vintage Quest", and The Panama City Times-Herald echoed this position:

 Critics debated the success of the show's premise. Peter Scisco of ComputerLife appreciated that the team "rely on their brains, not mutant superpowers". People praised Turner's shift from the "politically correct claptrap" of Captain Planet and the Planeteers, giving Real Adventures a B grade as "children's programming the way it oughta be". The authors of 1998's Saturday Morning Fever contrarily felt the show lacked "the sense of why the original was so successful". They disliked H-B's packaging of disparate seasons as one series, preferring the second for its characters and classic references. Greg Aaron of HotWired praised the franchise's return but warned against QuestWorld hype, arguing that "it will take more than visual sophistication to hook today's viewers".

Hanna-Barbera founder and chairman Joseph Barbera considered Real Adventures a "disaster" because of changes to the characters and stories. He conceded, "that's their business. Everybody needs to do their own thing." Critics generally enjoyed the characters and voice acting. People liked the cast, particularly George Segal. Saturday Morning Fever praised Jessie Bannon for her resemblance to Dr. Quest. Allan Johnson approved of the age jump, as Jonny and Hadji were now old enough to be part of the action. He considered Jessie "cool... she gives Jonny grief just because she can, and she's not afraid of the action." He did not enjoy the "toned down" portrayal of Race Bannon. Some fans objected to Race's Western accent in the first season. Peter Lawrence defended the portrayal of Race as a "man of action, not thought—though perfectly capable of deep thought", noting that his accent and mannerisms encouraged variety, surprise, and originality.

The quality of Quests traditional and computer animation split critics. The Toronto Star scathingly criticized the show for "facile plots heavily laced with jarring science fiction and incongruous computer animation", naming QuestWorld a "poorly explained techno-gimmick." Le Figaro concurred, but praised QuestWorld for capturing the attention of young viewers. The Star praised QuestWorld, but regarded traditional sequences as "flat and textureless, with minimal characterization, unnaturally stiff movement, and poor execution of shading and shadow". Ted Cox of the Chicago Daily Herald agreed that animated motion was sometimes "remarkably uneven", but lauded realistic imagery like "the play of light on the ocean". TV Guide also found the animation somewhat flat, but considered the sound effects and backgrounds to be state-of-the-art.

Special effects director Alberto Menache criticized QuestWorld in Understanding Motion Capture for Computer Animation and Video Games, considering it a mistake-laden failure. He explained that the size difference between the motion capturers and the characters caused unsteady animation and shaking, consequently mismatching interaction with props and uneven terrain. Menache blamed the show's budget, which did not allow for digital post-production and review; producers instead expected "plug-and-play" results straight from the capture studio. Menache concluded that the QuestWorld sequences suffered from a "pipeline set up for mass production" with little testing or planning. Quests Senior Vice President of Production Sherry Gunther admitted that the motion capture technology was "a little crude" and best suited for broad movements. Menache was less critical of the facial capture, considering it "medium-quality" but still unacceptable given H-B's resources. These criticisms mirrored the comments of Buzz F/X animator Francois Lord, who cited inexperienced Montreal animators and rushed production schedules. He pointed out that Blur Studios had more time, money, and experience for season two's sequences.

The show's sound was warmly received by the industry. Episodes "Nuclear Netherworld" and "Alien in Washington" were nominated respectively for music and sound editing Golden Reel Awards in 1997, and the entire series was nominated for an animated sound editing Golden Reel Award in 1998. Real Adventures'' was also nominated for a 1997 Daytime Emmy Award for music direction and composition.

References

Works cited

External links 
 
 
 JQStyle, a Jonny Quest fan site
 QuestFan, a series encyclopedia

Jonny Quest
TNT (American TV network) original programming
YTV (Canadian TV channel) original programming
Cartoon Network original programming
TBS (American TV channel) original programming
1990s American animated television series
1990s American science fiction television series
1996 American television series debuts
1997 American television series endings
American animated television spin-offs
American children's animated action television series
American children's animated adventure television series
American children's animated science fantasy television series
Teen animated television series
Television series by Hanna-Barbera
Television series by Warner Bros. Television Studios
Television series about alien visitations
Television shows about virtual reality
English-language television shows
Toonami
Fiction about neanderthals
Television shows adapted into comics
Television shows adapted into video games
Animated television series about orphans